The Tobe Hoofman Farmstead is a historic farm property in rural White County, Arkansas. It is located on the west side of Arkansas Highway 13 north of Judsonia and Arkansas Highway 157. The farmhouse is a vernacular -story wood-frame building, with a gable roof and a hip-roof porch with small gables over its access stairs. The wellhouse is a small wood-frame structure with a hip roof; the storm cellar is an earthen structure, mostly below ground, with a small above-ground access building. The barn is a transervse crib wood-frame structure with a gable roof. The farmstead was developed about 1910, and is a little-altered example of an early 20th-century farmstead.

The property was listed on the National Register of Historic Places in 1992.

See also
National Register of Historic Places listings in White County, Arkansas

References

Houses on the National Register of Historic Places in Arkansas
Houses completed in 1910
Houses in White County, Arkansas
National Register of Historic Places in White County, Arkansas
1910 establishments in Arkansas
Farms on the National Register of Historic Places in Arkansas